KT Shooting Team was formed in 1985. The South Korean National Shooting Team is the KT Shooting Team; all of its 11 shooters are part of the National Team. KT Company is sponsoring the KT Shooting Team. It’s the best shooting team in South Korea, and the team won a gold medal in the Beijing Olympics. The team has won many medals, see the medals section.

Medals
 2008 Beijing Olympics: 1 Gold Medal, 1 Silver Medal
 2006 World Shooting Championship: 1 Silver Medal
 2006 Doha Asian Games: 1 Gold Medal, 4 Silver Medals, 2 Bronze Medals
 2006 Guangzhou World Cup: 2 Gold Medals
 2004 Athens Olympics: 1 Silver Medal
 2003 SSF Changwon World Cup: 2 Gold Medals
 2002 Busan Asian Games: 1 Gold Medal, 5 Silver Medals, 3 Bronze Medals
 2002 World Shooting Championship: 2 Gold Medals, 1 Silver Medal, 1 Bronze Medal
 1998 World Shooting Championship: 2 Gold Medals
 1994 Hiroshima Asian Games: 2 Gold Medals
 1992 Barcelona Olympics: 1 Gold Medal
 1990 Beijing Asian Games: 1 Silver Medal, 1 Bronze Medal

Players
 Jin Jong-oh

See also
 Shooting at the Summer Olympics
 International Shooting Sport Federation

External links
 Official website 

Shooting sports organizations
Shooting